Most investigators accept the definition of language intensity proposed by John Waite Bowers: a quality of language that "indicates the degree to which toward a concept deviates from neutrality." Intensity as a lexical variable in communication studies has generated extensive empirical research.

Theoretical setting

A theory proposed by Bradac, Bowers, and Courtright (1979, 1980) asserts causal relationships among intensity and a number of other psychological, social, and communication variables. An experimental study by Hamilton, Hunter, and Burgoon (1990) generally supports the relationships proposed by the theory at least in the limited domain of persuasion.
 
Intensity has been related to:
 Other message variables including verbal immediacy, lexical diversity, message style, and verbal aggressiveness.
 Psychological variables such as cognitive stress, arousal, and need for approval.
 Attributional variables including attributions of source internality, attributions of source competence, and attributions of source similarity with audience.
 Speaker–audience attitudinal congruency and discrepancy.
 Credibility of message sources and of messages.
 Information processing.
 Practical variables such as response rate in e-mail surveys and family interventions protecting children from ultraviolet radiation.
 Language expectancy theory

References
 Anderson, P.A. & Blackburn, T.R. (2004). An experimental study of language intensity and response rate in email surveys. Communication Reports, 17, 73–84.
 Badzinski, D.M. (1989). Message intensity and cognitive representations of discourse effects on inferential processing. Human Communication Research, 16, 3–32.
 Basehart, J.R. (1971). Message opinionation and approval-dependence as determinants of receiver attitude change and recall. Speech Monographs, 38, 302–10.
 Bourhis, R.; Giles, H. & Tajfel, H. (1973). Language as a determinant of Welsh identity. European Journal of Social Psychology, 3, 447–60.
 Bowers, J.W. (1963). Language intensity, social introversion, and attitude change. Speech Monographs, 30, 345–52.
 Bowers, J.W. (1964). Some correlates of language intensity. Quarterly Journal of Speech, 50, 415–20.
 Bowers, J.W. (2006). Old eyes take a new look at Bradac's favorite variables. Journal of Language and Social Psychology, 25, 7–24.
 Bradac, J.J.; Bowers, J.W. & Courtright, J.A. (1979). Three language variables in communication research: Intensity, immediacy, and diversity. Human Communication Research, 5, 257–69.
 Bradac, J.J.; Bowers, J.W. & Courtright, J.A. (1980). Lexical variations in intensity, immediacy, and diversity: An axiomatic theory and causal model. In St. Clair, R.N. & Giles, H. (Eds.). The social and psychological contexts of language. Hillsdale, NJ: Lawrence Erlbaum, pp. 193–223.
 Bradac, J.J.; Hosman, L.A. & Tardy, C.H. (1978). Reciprocal disclosures and language intensity: Attributional consequences. Communication Monographs, 45, 1–17.
 Bradac, J.J.; Konsky, C.W. & Elliott, N.D. (1976). Verbal behavior of interviewees: The effects of several situational variables on verbal productivity, disfluency, and lexical diversity. Journal of Communication Disorders, 9, 211–25.
 Buller, D.B.; Burgoon, M.; Hall, J.R.; Levine, N.; Taylor, A.M.; Beach, B.H.; Melcher, C.; Buller, M.K.; Bowen, S.L.; Hunsaker, F.G. & Bergen, A. (2000). Using language intensity to increase the success of family intervention to protect children from ultraviolet radiation. Preventive Medicine, 30, 103–13.
 Burgoon, M.; Jones, S.B. & Stewart, D. (1975). Toward a message-centered theory of persuasion: Three empirical investigations of language intensity. Human Communication Research, 1, 240–56.
 Burgoon, M. & Miller, G.R. (1971). Prior attitudes and language intensity as predictors of message style and attitude change following counterattitudinal advocacy. Journal of Personality and Social Psychology, 20, 240–53.
 Carmichael, C.W. & Cronkhite, G.L. (1965). Frustration and language intensity. Speech Monographs, 32, 107–11.
 Daly, J.A. & Miller, M.D. (1975). Apprehension of writing as a predictor of message intensity. Journal of Psychology, 89, 175–7.
 Franzwa, H.H. (1969). Psychological factors influencing use of "evaluative-dynamic" language. Speech Monographs, 36, 103–9.
 Greenberg, B.S. (1976). The effects of language intensity modifications on perceived verbal aggressiveness. Communication Monographs, 43, 130–9.
 Hamilton, M.A.; Hunter, J.E. & Burgoon, M. (1990). An empirical test of an axiomatic model of the relationship between language intensity and persuasion. Journal of Language and Social Psychology, 9, 235–56.
 Infante, D.A. (1975). Effects of opinionated language on communicative image and as conferring resistance to persuasion. Western Speech Communication, 39, 112–29.
 McEwen, W.J. & Greenberg, B.S. (1970). Effects of message intensity on receiver evaluation of source, message, and topic. Journal of Communication, 20, 340–50.
 Mehrley, R.S. & McCroskey, J.C. (1970). Opinionated statements and attitude intensity as predictors of attitude change and source credibility. Speech Monographs, 37, 47–52.
 Miller, G.R. & Basehart, J. (1969). Source trustworthiness, opinionated statements, and responses to persuasive communication. Speech Monographs, 36, 1–7.
 Miller, G.R. & Lobe, J. (1967). Opinionated language, open- and closed-mindedness and response to persuasive communications. Journal of Communication, 17, 333–41. 
 Osgood, C.E. & Walker, E.G. (1959). Motivation and language behavior: A content analysis of suicide notes. Journal of Abnormal and Social Psychology, 59, 58–67.
 Rotter, J.B. (1966). Generalized expectancies for internal versus external control of reinforcement. Psychological Monographs, 80, whole no. 609.
 Wheeless, L.R. (1978). A follow-up study of the relationship among trust, disclosure, and interpersonal solidarity. Human Communication Research, 4, 143–57.

Notes

Pragmatics
Behavioral concepts